Iloilo City is a conglomeration of former cities and towns, which are now the geographical or administrative districts (boroughs) composed of seven: Arevalo, City Proper, Jaro, La Paz, Lapuz, Mandurriao, and Molo. All administrative districts are divisions of the lone congressional district of Iloilo City, and each is composed of barangays (barrios), with a total of 180 city barangays.

The City of Iloilo was originally referred to only as what is now known as Iloilo City Proper until July 16, 1937, when the surrounding municipalities of Arevalo, La Paz, Mandurriao, and Molo were consolidated with the city after it was re-chartered by the American government. The city of Jaro followed suit and was absorbed into Iloilo City on January 7, 1941. The sub-district of Lapuz became a separate district from La Paz on December 17, 2008, making it the seventh and youngest district of Iloilo City.

Description and list of barangays 
Iloilo City is composed of one legislative district, which has been divided into seven administrative districts, each of which consists of barangays.

Iloilo City Proper 

 City Proper is the second-most densely populated district and the heart of Iloilo City. It serves as the civic center of the city, housing the seat of the city and provincial government buildings, as well as other local, provincial, and regional government offices of the Western Visayas region. All the economic activities in the city have been mainly concentrated in the district since the 19th century; however, in the 21st century, they have slowly shifted to the districts of Mandurriao and Jaro due to a lack of space for new developments in the old City Proper. Iloilo City Proper is known for its late 19th and early 20th century commercial structures, such as the Eusebio Villanueva Building, the Javellana Building, the Aduana Building, etc., which can be found on every major street of the district.

Iloilo City Proper has the most number of barangays in Iloilo City, with a total of 45.

 Arsenal Aduana
 Baybay Tanza
 Bonifacio Tanza
 Concepcion-Montes
 Danao
 Delgado-Jalandoni-Bagumbayan
 Edganzon
 Flores
 General Hughes-Montes
 Gloria
 Hipodromo
 Inday
 Jalandoni-Wilson
 Kahirupan
 Kauswagan
 Legaspi dela Rama
 Liberation
 Mabolo-Delgado
 Magsaysay
 Malipayon-Delgado
 Maria Clara
 Monica Blumentritt
 Muelle Loney-Montes
 Nonoy
 Ortiz
 Osmeña
 President Roxas
 Rima-Rizal
 Rizal Estanzuela
 Rizal Ibarra
 Rizal Palapala I
 Rizal Palapala II
 Roxas Village
 Sampaguita
 San Agustin
 San Felix
 San Jose
 Santo Rosario-Duran
 Tanza-Esperanza
 Timawa Tanza I
 Timawa Tanza II
 Veterans Village
 Villa Anita
 Yulo-Arroyo
 Zamora-Melliza

La Paz 

 La Paz is the city's third-largest district by land area. It is known as the birthplace of the popular Filipino noodle soup dish, La Paz Batchoy. The district features the largest district plaza in Iloilo City. It is home to numerous notable institutions in the city, namely, West Visayas State University, Iloilo Science and Technology University, Western Institute of Technology, St. Therese – MTC Colleges, Hua Siong College of Iloilo, etc.

The district of La Paz has a total of 25 barangays.
 Aguinaldo
 Baldoza
 Bantud
 Banuyao
 Burgos-Mabini-Plaza
 Caingin
 Divinagracia
 Gustilo
 Hinactacan
 Ingore
 Jereos
 Laguda
 Lopez Jaena Norte
 Lopez Jaena Sur
 Luna
 MacArthur
 Magdalo
 Magsaysay Village
 Nabitasan
 Railway
 Rizal
 San Isidro
 San Nicolas
 Tabuc Suba
 Ticud

Jaro 

 Jaro is the largest and most populous district of the city, comprising 35% of the city's total land area and 29% of the city's population. It is the center of faith in the Western Visayas region, being home to the Jaro Metropolitan Cathedral, the headquarters of the Roman Catholic Archdiocese of Jaro, the metropolitan see that covers the whole province of Iloilo, as well as Antique, Guimaras, and Negros Occidental. Jaro being a former city on its own with a large population of Spanish Filipino residents, it is home to a large number of old mansions and heritage houses such as the Lopez Mansion, the Lizares Mansion, the Ledesma Mansion, the Casa Mariquit, etc. The district is also home to Central Philippine University, which has been ranked as the first Western Visayan university on the list of Asia's and the world's best universities by Quacquarelli Symonds. Jaro, along Mandurriao, is home to modern large developments in the city, namely Sta. Lucia Land's Green Meadows East township, SM Prime's 48-hectare SM Jaro township, etc.

The district of Jaro has the second-most barangays in the city, with a total of 42.

 Arguelles
 Balabago
 Balantang
 Benedicto
 Bito-on
 Buhang
 Buntatala
 Calubihan
 Camalig
 Claudio Castilla El-98
 Cuartero
 Cubay
 Democracia
 Desamparados
 Dungon A
 Dungon B
 Fajardo
 Javellana
 Lanit
 Libertad Santa Isabel
 Lopez Jaena
 Luna
 M.H. del Pilar
 M.V. Hechanova
 Ma. Cristina
 Montinola
 Our Lady of Fatima
 Our Lady of Lourdes
 Quintin Salas
 Sambag
 San Isidro
 San Jose
 San Pedro
 San Roque
 San Vicente
 Seminario
 Simon Ledesma
 Tabuc Suba
 Tacas
 Tagbac
 Taytay Zone II
 Ungka

Molo 

 Molo is the most densely populated district, with a population density of 13,797 people per square kilometer, as well as the second-most populated district. It is famous for its Gothic-Renaissance Molo Church and several old heritage houses, including the Yusay-Consing Mansion, more popularly known as the Molo Mansion. Pancit Molo is the district's most popular dish, which is a pork dumpling soup made with wonton wrappers. Molo was known as the Chinese district of Iloilo, which is the area that the Chinese Filipino residents of Iloilo lived in. It is also hailed as the "Athens of the Philippines," being the birthplace of numerous great philosophers and political leaders in the country.

The district of Molo has a total of 25 barangays.

 Calumpang
 Cochero
 Compania
 East Baluarte
 East Timawa
 Habog-Habog Salvacion
 Infante
 Kasingkasing
 Katilingban
 Molo Boulevard
 North Avanceña
 North Baluarte
 North Fundidor
 North San Jose
 Poblacion
 San Antonio
 San Juan
 San Pedro
 South Baluarte
 South Fundidor
 South San Jose
 Taal
 Tap-oc
 West Habog-Habog
 West Timawa

Mandurriao 

 Mandurriao is the second-largest district by land area and the third-most populous. It is known for its modern, large mixed-use developments, such as Megaworld Corporation's Iloilo Business Park, Ayala Land's Atria Park District, SM Prime Holdings' SM Iloilo Complex, Gaisano Group of Companies' Iloilo City Center, etc., where the majority of the city's high-rise buildings are located. It is also home to many upscale restaurants, bars, nightclubs, hotels, condominiums, and business process outsourcing (BPO) offices, as well as the largest mall in Iloilo, SM City Iloilo.

The district of Mandurriao has a total of 18 barangays.

 Abeto Mirasol Taft South (Quirino Abeto)
 Airport (Tabucan Airport)
 Bakhaw
 Bolilao
 Buhang Taft North
 Calahunan
 Dungon C
 Guzman-Jesena
 Hibao-an Norte
 Hibao-an Sur
 Navais
 Oñate de Leon
 Pale Benedicto Rizal
 PHHC Block 17
 PHHC Block 22 NHA
 San Rafael
 Santa Rosa
 Tabucan

Villa de Arevalo 

 Arevalo is the westernmost and farthest district from Iloilo City Proper. It is well-known for its seafood restaurants along the seashores of Villa Beach, which hosts the Paraw Regatta Festival. The district's parish, the Santo Niño de Arevalo Parish, is home to the third-oldest Santo Niño figure in the Philippines. It is also home to Camiña Balay nga Bato, a heritage house and a restaurant in the district that was constructed in 1865.

The district of Arevalo has a total of 13 barangays.

 Bonifacio
 Calaparan
 Dulonan
 Mohon
 Quezon
 San José
 Santa Cruz
 Santa Filomina
 Santo Domingo
 Santo Niño Norte
 Santo Niño Sur
 Sooc
 Yulo Drive

Lapuz 

 Lapuz is the geographically smallest and least populous district in Iloilo City. It is considered the gateway to Iloilo City, being the location of the Iloilo International Port, the Iloilo Ro-ro (roll-on, roll-off) Port, and the Iloilo Fastcraft Terminal.

The district of Lapuz has a total of 12 barangays.

 Alalasan
 Bo. Obrero
 Don Esteban
 Jalandoni Estate
 Lapuz Norte
 Lapuz Sur
 Libertad
 Loboc
 Mansaya
 Progreso
 Punong
 Sinikway

References 

Districts of Iloilo City
Politics of Iloilo City
Iloilo City